Cerna is a surname. Notable people with the surname include:

 Panait Cerna (1881–1913), Romanian writer
 J. D. Cerna, American actor
 Ismael Cerna (1856–1901), Guatemalan poet
 Ricardo Alfonso Cerna (1956–2003), Guatemalan American suspect who committed suicide on live cctv
 Vicente Cerna y Cerna (1815–1885), president of Guatemala

See also 
 Cernea (surname)

Spanish-language surnames
Surnames of Peruvian origin
Surnames of Guatemalan origin